Buttiauxella izardii  is a bacterium from the genus of Buttiauxella which has been isolated from a snail in Braunschweig in Germany. Buttiauxella izardii is named after the French microbiologist Daniel Izard.

References

Further reading 
 
	

Enterobacteriaceae
Bacteria described in 1996